Spring Lake is a lake located along Maybee Road at an elevation of .

The lake, with a depth of 15 feet, lies within Independence Township in Oakland County, Michigan.

Golf
Spring Lake is home to Fountains public golf course.

References

Lakes of Oakland County, Michigan
Lakes of Independence Township, Michigan